Reneta Tsvetkova (born 19 November 1957) is a Bulgarian former gymnast. She competed at the 1972 Summer Olympics.

References

External links
 

1957 births
Living people
Bulgarian female artistic gymnasts
Olympic gymnasts of Bulgaria
Gymnasts at the 1972 Summer Olympics
Sportspeople from Ruse, Bulgaria